The Boyracer e.p. is the second EP by The Brunettes. It was released in 2003 on Lil' Chief Records.

Reception

The Boyracer e.p. garnered 3 and half stars out of 5 on Allmusic.

Track listing
 "Boyracer" – 3:22
 "Lovers Park" – 3:00
 "Vaudeville" – 3:24
 "I Miss My Coochie Coo" – 3:10
 "Don't Neglect Your Pet" – 3:03
 "Maybe White Palisades" – 3:30

Personnel
 Jonathan Bree — Vocals, Guitar, Synthesizer, Bass, Drum Machine
 Heather Mansfield — Vocals, Glockenspiel, Piano, Harmonica, Organ, Xylophone
 James Milne - Guitar, Piano, Harmonium, Beat-boxing, Backing vocals
 Kari Hammond — Drums, Percussion
 Gerald Stewart — Electric Bass Guitar, Backing vocals

References

External links
Lil' Chief Records: The Brunettes
Lil' Chief Records
The Brunettes on MySpace

The Brunettes albums
2003 EPs
Lil' Chief Records EPs